Archibald Keir Leitch (27 April 1865 – 25 April 1939) was a Scottish architect, most famous for his work designing football stadiums throughout Great Britain and Ireland.

Early work
Born in Glasgow, Leitch's early work was on designing tea factories in Deltota in the former Kandyan Kingdom of Ceylon, as well as factories in his home city and in Lanarkshire, the sole surviving example of which being the category A listed  at Jessie Street, Polmadie, south of Glasgow city centre. In 1896 he became a member of the Institution of Engineers and Shipbuilders in Scotland, and later of the Institution of Mechanical Engineers. He moved into stadium design when he was commissioned to build Ibrox Park, the new home ground of his boyhood heroes Rangers, in 1899.

Stadium design

Leitch's stadiums were initially considered functional rather than aesthetically elegant, and were clearly influenced by his early work on industrial buildings. Typically, his stands had two tiers, with criss-crossed steel balustrades at the front of the upper tier, and were covered by a series of pitched roofs, built so that their ends faced onto the playing field; the central roof span would be distinctly larger, and would incorporate a distinctive pediment.

His first project in England was the design and building of the John Street Stand at Bramall Lane, which provided 3,000 seats and terracing for 6,000 and was dominated by a large mock-Tudor press box.

Leitch's reputation as an architect was damaged as a result of the Ibrox disaster of 1902, when 25 people were killed when a bank of wooden terracing collapsed due to substandard pine being used in the terraces. Leitch, in attendance at the disaster, convinced Rangers to hire him to build the replacement stand. Leitch patented a new form of strengthening terraces for the Ibrox rebuild. Over the next four decades he became Britain's foremost football architect. In total he was commissioned to design part or all of more than 20 stadiums in the UK and Ireland between 1899 and 1939, including:

 Anfield, Liverpool
 Arsenal Stadium, Highbury, London
 Ayresome Park, Middlesbrough
 Bramall Lane, Sheffield
 Cardiff Arms Park, Cardiff
 Celtic Park, Glasgow
 Craven Cottage, Fulham, London
 Dalymount Park, Dublin, Ireland
 Deepdale, Preston
 The Old Den, New Cross, London
 Dens Park, Dundee
 The Dell, Southampton
 Ewood Park, Blackburn
 The Double Decker stand (The Kop), Filbert Street, Leicester
 Fratton Park, Portsmouth
 Goodison Park, Liverpool
 Hampden Park, Glasgow
 Home Park, Plymouth
 Hyde Road Football Stadium, Manchester (General ground improvements 1911-1914 and was planning a complete rebuild of the ground to accommodate 100,000 but war broke out, bringing a halt to those plans)
 Ibrox Park, Glasgow
 Hillsborough Stadium, Sheffield
 Lansdowne Road, Dublin, Ireland
 Leeds Road, Huddersfield
 Molineux, Wolverhampton
 Old Trafford, Trafford, Greater Manchester
 Park Avenue, Bradford
 Pittodrie Stadium, Aberdeen
 Roker Park, Sunderland
 Rugby Park, Kilmarnock
 Saltergate, Chesterfield
 Selhurst Park, South Norwood, London
 Somerset Park, Ayr
 Stamford Bridge, Fulham, London
 Stark's Park, Kirkcaldy
 Twickenham Stadium, Twickenham, London
 Tynecastle Park, Edinburgh
 Valley Parade, Bradford (Midland Road stand and other extensions)
 Villa Park, Birmingham
 West Ham Stadium, Custom House, Newham, London
 White Hart Lane, Tottenham, London
 Windsor Park, Belfast, Northern Ireland

Many of his works have since been demolished for redevelopment, especially in wake of the Taylor Report and the move to all-seater stadiums. For instance, the Trinity Road Stand at Villa Park, considered his masterpiece, was demolished in 2000. The main stand and pavilion at Craven Cottage, the facade of the main stand at Ibrox (although the stand itself has been remodelled) and the Bullens Road and Gwladys Street stands at Goodison Park survive; they are now listed buildings, as was the Leitch-designed main stand at Heart of Midlothian's Tynecastle Park; however, in 2016 permission was granted for that structure to be demolished and replaced.

References

Further reading 
 
 
 Oxford University Press | Biography

External links 
 Explore Glasgow – All round the city Features architectural elevations of all Leitch's stadiums in Glasgow.

1865 births
1939 deaths
Scottish architects
Football in the United Kingdom
Architects from Glasgow
Place of death missing
Stadium architects